Sigmaringen (Swabian: Semmerenga) is a town in southern Germany, in the state of Baden-Württemberg. Situated on the upper Danube, it is the capital of the Sigmaringen district.

Sigmaringen is renowned for its castle, Schloss Sigmaringen, which was the seat of the principality of Hohenzollern-Sigmaringen until 1850 and is still owned by the Hohenzollern family.

Geography
Sigmaringen lies in the Danube valley, surrounded by wooded hills south of the Swabian Alb and around 40 km north of Lake Constance.

The surrounding towns are Winterlingen (in the district of Zollernalb) and Veringenstadt in the north, Bingen, Sigmaringendorf, and Scheer in the east, Mengen, Krauchenwies, Inzigkofen, and Meßkirch in the south, and Leibertingen, Beuron, and Stetten am kalten Markt in the west.
The town is made up of the following districts: Sigmaringen town center, Gutenstein, Jungnau, Laiz, Oberschmeien, and Unterschmeien.

History
Sigmaringen was first documented in 1077 and was part of the principality of Hohenzollern-Sigmaringen until 1850, after which it became the Prussian Province of Hohenzollern.

Middle Ages
In the 11th century, the end of the Early Middle Ages, the first castle was built on the rock that protected the valley. The first written reference dates from 1077, when King Rudolf of Rheinfelden tried in vain to conquer Sigmaringen Castle. The city was officially founded in 1250. In 1325, it was sold to Ulrich III, Count of Württemberg. In 1460 and 1500, the castle was rebuilt into a chateau. About the county of Werdenberg Sigmaringen came in 1535 to the high noble family of the Hohenzollern.

Modern times

In 1632, the Swedes occupied the castle during the Thirty Years' War.

From 1806 to 1849, Sigmaringen was the capital of the sovereign Principality Hohenzollern-Sigmaringen and residence of the princes of Hohenzollern. 
As a result of the Sigmaringen Revolution of 1848, the Princes of Hechingen and Sigmaringen abdicated, whereby both principalities fell to Prussia in 1850. From 1850 to 1945, Sigmaringen was the seat of the Prussian Government for the Province of Hohenzollern. Karl Anton von Hohenzollern was 1858-1862 Prime Minister of Prussia. 
From 1914 to 1918, around 150 men from the town lost their lives during World War I. 
In the Nazi era, a Gestapo office was located in Sigmaringen. From 1937, it belonged to Stuttgart's Gestapo.

Between 1934 and 1942, more than 100 men were sterilized because of "hereditary diseases". On 12 December 1940, during the Nazi medical experiments known as the "T4", 71 mentally disabled and mentally ill patients became the victims of Nazi injustice. These men and women were deported to the Grafeneck Euthanasia Centre, where they were killed as "unworthy of life". After the closure of Grafeneck in December 1940, a further deportation to the Hadamar Euthanasia Centre occurred on 14 March 1941.

Vichy French enclave (1944–1945)

On 7 September 1944, following the Allied invasion of France, Philippe Pétain and members of the Vichy government cabinet were relocated to Germany. A city-state ruled by the government in exile headed by Fernand de Brinon was established at Sigmaringen. There were three embassies in the city-state, representing each of Vichy-France's allies: Germany, Italy, and Japan.

French writers Louis-Ferdinand Céline, Lucien Rebatet and Roland Gaucher, fearing for their lives because of their political and anti-Semitic writings, fled along with the Vichy government to Sigmaringen. Céline's novel D'un château l'autre (English: Castle to Castle) describes the fall of Sigmaringen. The city was taken by Free French forces on 22 April 1945. Pétain returned to France, where he stood trial for treason.

Religions
The following religions are present in Sigmaringen:
 Catholic Church
 Evangelische Landeskirche in Württemberg
 Evangelische Militärkirchengemeinde
 Pentecostalism
 Jehovah's Witnesses
 New Apostolic Church

Transportation infrastructure
Three railways meet in Sigmaringen, the Ulm–Sigmaringen railway leading to Ulm, the Tübingen–Sigmaringen railway from Tübingen to Aulendorf and connecting to the Tuttlingen–Inzigkofen railway to Tuttlingen, and the Engstingen–Sigmaringen railway operated by the Hohenzollerische Landesbahn.

Sigmaringen lies in the serving area of Verkehrsverbund Neckar-Alb-Donau (NALDO).

Notable residents
Sigmaringen was the birthplace of Saint Fidelis of Sigmaringen, a Roman Catholic martyr of the Counter-Reformation in Switzerland, and Ferdinand of Romania, King of Romania. It was one of the residences of deceased Prince Friedrich Wilhelm of Hohenzollern-Sigmaringen, the late representative of the house, who was the first in the line of succession to the throne of Romania, by Salic law. Frederick Miller, founder of the Miller Brewing Company, was living in Sigmaringen during the start of his brewing career.

People who worked locally

 Louis-Ferdinand Céline (1894–1961), pro-Nazi and antisemitic French writer, fled in 1944 to Sigmaringen, along with several members of the Vichy government. 
 Lucien Rebatet (1903–1972), pro-Nazi and antisemitic French writer, fled in 1944 to Sigmaringen, along with several members of the Vichy government.
 Winfried Kretschmann (born 1948), politician, Minister-President of Baden-Württemberg (The Greens), lives in the district of Laiz.

Notable people

 Rosina Gräf genannt Nellin  (born in Sigmaringen, died 1577) not guilty in fire as witch
 Richard Lauchert (1825–1868), painter and professor
 Theodor Bilharz (1825–1862), physician and scientist
 Carol I of Romania (1839-1914), King of Romania
 Ferdinand I of Romania (1865-1927), King of Romania
 Max Giese (1879–1935), contractor, inventor of the concrete pump
 Josef Henselmann (1898–1987), sculptor and longtime head of the Academy of Fine Arts in Munich
 Franz Gog (1907–1980), a member of the state parliament in Württemberg-Hohenzollern and later Baden-Württemberg, was a judge in Sigmaringen
 Johann Georg of Hohenzollern (1932–2016), art historian and museum director
 Hermann Schwörer (1922-2017), lawyer, entrepreneur and politician (CDU), was a recipient of the Medal of Merit of the State of Baden-Württemberg as of 1998
 Karl Lehmann (1936-2018), Cardinal and Bishop of Mainz, from 1987 to 2008 chairman of the German Bishops' Conference
 Lothar Späth (1937–2016), politician (CDU), former Prime Minister of Baden-Württemberg
 Dietmar Schlee (1938-2002), politician (CDU), holder of the Medal of Merit of the State of Baden-Württemberg since 1989
 Norbert Lins (born 1977), politician (CDU), Member of the European Parliament, looks after the administrative district of Tübingen
 Pascal Wehrlein (born 1994), Formula 1 racing driver

Bibliography

References

External links

 Official website
 Sigmaringen castle

Populated places on the Danube
Towns in Baden-Württemberg
Vichy France
Sigmaringen (district)